Get Up, Stand Up: The Story of Pop and Politics is a 6x60 minutes documentary TV-series about the relationship between singers and politics in the US, the UK, Germany and France from the 1960s until 2003. It was made in 2003 by Rudi Dolezal, Hannes Rossacher and Simon Witter as a joint production between German ZDF and the French-German culture channel Arte. It has since been shown by a number of other broadcasters in Europe, but also by Australia's ABC.

The series features interviews with well known singers and songwriters including Joan Baez, Tom Paxton, Bono, David Bowie, Johnny Cash, Daniel Cohn-Bendit, Bob Dylan, Ice-T, Bob Geldof, Willie Nelson, Roger Waters, Bruce Springsteen, Pete Seeger, and Neil Young.

A much shorter, two-hour version, called Get Up, Stand Up: The Story of Pop and Protest, aired on PBS in September 2005, hosted and narrated by co-founder of Public Enemy Chuck D. The PBS version focuses mainly on the American history of protest songs.

The title is borrowed from the reggae protest song Get Up, Stand Up by Bob Marley and Peter Tosh.

Episodes 

 Part 1: We Shall Overcome - An introductory overview
 Part 2: Next Stop is Vietnam - The music of the Vietnam War peace movement in the 1960s
 Part 3: Fight the Power - Protest music in the 1970s and the 1980s
 Part 4: Say it Loud - An overview of politics in black music, from Paul Robeson to Ms Dynamite
 Part 5: We Are The World - the big aid concerts of the 1990s
 Part 6: What's Going On - In the new millennium, musicians like Bono and Bob Geldof become political lobbyists

External links

References

Documentaries about politics
Documentary television series about music
Political activism